Classico (Italian) or Clássico (Portuguese) is a word for "classic", and may refer to:

Classico (album), a 2000 album by Bassi Maestro
"Classico", the second track on the album The Pick of Destiny by Tenacious D
Classico, an Italian wine denomination
Classico, an American brand of pasta sauce sold by Heinz
O Clássico, a Portuguese football rivalry
El Clásico, a Spanish football rivalry